Tunisia is divided into 24 governorates (wilayat, sing. wilayah). This term in Arabic can also be translated as province or federated state (though the latter does not apply, as Tunisia is a unitary state).

The governorates are divided into 264 delegations (mutamadiyat), and further subdivided into municipalities (baladiyat), and sectors (imadats). Tunisia is divided into 6 regions. It is mostly temperate near the capital Tunis, but becomes more arid in the southern regions due to the Saharan Desert.

See also
 Grand Tunis
 ISO 3166-2:TN

References

 
Subdivisions of Tunisia
Tunisia, Governorates
Tunisia 1
Governorates, Tunisia
Tunisia geography-related lists
Tunisia